Imasy is a rural locality (a village) in Ivanchinskoye Rural Settlement, Gaynsky District, Perm Krai, Russia. The population was 143 as of 2010.

Geography 
Imasy is located 43 km south of Gayny (the district's administrative centre) by road. Nikonovo is the nearest rural locality.

References 

Rural localities in Gaynsky District